Robert Royal (b. December 21, 1949 "Robert Royal 1949-", Library of Congress card catalog.) is a Catholic author and the president of the Faith & Reason Institute based in Washington, D.C.

Early life and education 
Robert Royal was born in Connecticut and received his BA in English and MA in Italian Studies from Brown University and his PhD in Comparative Literature from The Catholic University of America. He was a Fulbright Scholar."Profile: Robert Royal", Catholic Distance University, accessed May 13, 2022.

Career 
Robert Royal has taught at Brown University, Rhode Island College, and The Catholic University of America.

From 1980 to 1982 he was editor-in-chief of Prospect magazine, a publication of the conservative Concerned Alumni of Princeton. 

From 1986 to 1999 he served as vice president of the Ethics and Public Policy Center, along with president George Weigel from 1989 to 1996.

He is editor-in-chief of The Catholic Thing, an online publication he launched with Michael Novak in 2008 and published by the Faith & Reason Institute.

In 2020, he was named the first St. John Henry Newman Visiting Chair in Catholic Studies at Thomas More College of Liberal Arts in Merrimack NH."Dr. Robert Royal Appointed St. John Henry Newman Visiting Chair in Catholic Studies", Thomas More College news. September 2020.

Royal has served as a commentator for EWTN.

Views 
Royal is generally conservative and a critic of secularism. In his words, "We don't hold up the Bible, we make arguments," where the purpose is "to reconnect to the Catholic tradition".

Bibliography
 1492 And All That: Political Manipulations of History, 1992
 Reinventing the American People: Unity and Diversity Today, 1995
 The Virgin and the Dynamo: Use and Abuse of Religion in Environmental Debates, 1999
 Dante Alighieri: Divine Comedy, Divine Spirituality, 1999
 The Catholic Martyrs of the Twentieth Century: A Comprehensive Global History, 2000
 The Pope's Army: 500 Years of the Papal Swiss Guard, 2006
 The God that Did Not Fail: How Religion Built and Sustains the West, 2006
 A Deeper Vision: The Catholic Intellectual Tradition in the Twentieth Century, 2015
 Columbus and the Crisis of the West (2020)

References

External links
 The Faith & Reason Institute
 The Catholic Thing
 Robert Royal's articles, at Crisis Magazine
  (Ethics and Public Policy Center)
  (Faith & Reason Institute)

Roman Catholic writers
Brown University alumni
Catholic University of America alumni
Living people
Catholic University of America faculty
Members of the European Academy of Sciences and Arts
Year of birth missing (living people)
Conservatism in the United States